Adésio Alves Machado (12 January 1933 – 2 July 2009), known as just Adésio, was a Brazilian footballer who competed in the 1952 Summer Olympics.

References

1933 births
2009 deaths
Association football midfielders
Brazilian footballers
Olympic footballers of Brazil
Footballers at the 1952 Summer Olympics
CR Vasco da Gama players